Harvey Wilfred Schroeder (born June 16, 1933) is a former businessman and political figure in British Columbia. He represented Chilliwack in the Legislative Assembly of British Columbia from 1972 to 1986 as a Social Credit member.

He worked as an accountant for Canada Packers, later opening his own business in Chilliwack.

In 1973, he ran for the leadership of the Social Credit party. Schroeder was speaker for the British Columbia assembly from 1979 to 1982. Schroeder resigned as speaker in August 1982 and subsequently served in the provincial cabinet as Minister of Agriculture.

References 

1933 births
Living people
British Columbia Social Credit Party MLAs
Canadian accountants
Canadian Mennonites
Members of the Executive Council of British Columbia
Speakers of the Legislative Assembly of British Columbia